Christine Beattie (2 January 1965 - 28 May 2018) was an American developmental neurobiologist.

Christine obtained a bachelor in chemistry and did her PhD in neuropharmacology at Case Western Reserve University. She continued as a postdoctoral researcher at the University of Oregon in the laboratory of Judith Eisen, where she began working on motoneuron development using the model organism zebrafish.

She became a professor in the Department of Neuroscience at The Ohio State University. During her 20 years of tenure she made important contributions to the fundamental biology of neuromuscular junctions using the model organism zebrafish.

Since 2019, the International Zebrafish Society has awarded the Christine Beattie Award in her honor to outstanding presenters at the International Zebrafish Conference.

References

Developmental biologists
American women neuroscientists
American neuroscientists
Ohio State University faculty
Case Western Reserve University alumni
Neuropharmacologists
1965 births
2018 deaths
American women academics
21st-century American women